Sun Life Financial Inc. is a Canadian financial services company. It is primarily known as a life insurance company.

Sun Life has a presence in investment management with over CAD$1.3 trillion in assets under management operating in a number of countries. It has over $125 billion in assets under administration as of 2020. Sun Life ranks number 235 on the Forbes Global 2000 list for 2022.

History

Pre-World War II
Founded in Montreal, Quebec, as The Sun Insurance Company of Montreal in 1865 by Matthew Hamilton Gault (1822–1887), an Irish immigrant who settled in Montreal in 1842. However, operations actually began in 1871. By the end of the 19th century, it had expanded to Central and South America, the United States, the United Kingdom, West Indies, Japan, China, Philippines, India, North Africa and other international markets. During the next five decades, the company grew and prospered, surviving the difficulties of World War I and the large drain on its finances through policy claims arising from the large number of deaths caused by the Great Flu Epidemic of 1918.

The company's original Dominion Square building in Montreal was built in 1918. Capping a Montreal construction boom that began in the 1920s, the company completed construction of the expansion of its headquarters with its new 26-story headquarters north tower in 1933. Although the head office of the Royal Bank of Canada on St. James Street was taller by several floors, the Sun Life Building was at the time the largest building in terms of square footage anywhere in the British Empire.

Chartered in 1865, its traditional base business worldwide remains life insurance. However, it now also has significant asset management operations. In 1919, it was the first Canadian company to offer group life insurance. Having begun its first US operations in 1895, the company sold its first group life plan in the U.S. in 1924.

World War II
In World War II, as part of Operation Fish, securities from the United Kingdom were secretly moved to the Sun Life Building for safekeeping. A persistent, but incorrect, rumour is that the Crown Jewels of the United Kingdom were illegally shipped out of the United Kingdom during WWII and stored there was deliberately spread in Montreal to account for increased activity at the building.

Post-World War II
During the post-war period, the company's successful business strategies made it one of Montreal's largest white-collar employers, one of the top corporations in Canada, as well as a global player in the life insurance field. For the first half of the 20th century, the city of Montreal had been the economic hub of Canada, but it was losing ground to Toronto. As early as 1950, Toronto's economic activity surpassed Montreal's with regard to stock market trading and capitalization. The advent, in the 1960s, of political and terrorist movements demanding the independence of Quebec from Canada cast a pallor of uncertainty over the business community.

1977–1980
In 1977, the newly-elected sovereigntist Quebec government passed the Charter of the French Language (known as Bill 101), making the use of French language mandatory for medium- and large-scale companies when communicating with French-speaking staff. The law was received negatively by the English-speaking business community, many of whom perceived that the historical rights of the English-speaking minority should be respected. The new government also promised a referendum on Quebec sovereignty, injecting instability into the Montreal business community. On January 6, 1978, Sun Life became the first large company to leave Quebec post-election, announcing that it would move its head office to rented space in Toronto, Ontario. Officially, Sun Life said it was motivated by the political instability and economic uncertainty of Quebec's future, but skeptics said it was the company's unwillingness to comply with the requirements of Bill 101. In a reaction the next day, the province's finance minister Jacques Parizeau called Sun Life "one of the worst exporters of Quebec capital", and threatened to freeze some $400 million CAD in assets.

In 1979, the company acquired a property at University Avenue and King Street in downtown Toronto and constructed a new office complex, the Sun Life Centre, which was completed in 1984.

Bill 101 required more than French communications with French-speaking staff. It made French the official language of the workplace. It also provided that present and prospective employees who could not speak English not be discriminated against because of their inability to speak English.

For the largest employer of English-speaking people in Montreal, this would make things very difficult. Many, if not most, of Sun Life's Head Office employees in 1979 were not fluent in French. Sun Life was quite clear that this was the reason for its move when it made the announcement. The PQ government was quick to label Sun Life "bad corporate citizens" and claimed that if "they had only warned us, we could have worked something out."

The downsizing of Sun Life's Montreal office did not take place overnight. Transfers and moves occurred on a departmental basis and did not commence until several months after the announcement. By 1980, 300 head office employees were located in Toronto.

There were several other key activities in the post-war years. This included a decision by Sun Life to leave many markets, including China and India, because of economic and political changes. In 1962, Sun Life became a mutual company and repurchased its shares for $65 million in total. In 1973, Sun Life opened its American subsidiary's new headquarters in Wellesley Hills, Massachusetts, located outside Boston.

1980s–1990s
Sun Life continued to expand its wealth management business with the 1982 acquisition of Massachusetts Financial Services (MFS), the Boston-based investment management and mutual fund company. It entered the mutual fund business in Canada by forming Spectrum Mutual Fund Services in 1987 (subsequently sold to CI Financial) and a decade later, acquired McLean Budden, a Canadian investment management firm (subsequently folded into MFS).
International expansion continued in the 1990s. In 1995, Sun Life entered the Indonesian market through local company PT Asuransi Modern Sun Life, now called PT Sun Life Indonesia, and opened a Representative Office in Beijing in preparation to enter China. A year later, Sun Life opened a services center in Waterford, Ireland, to provide technology and business processing support for Sun Life business units.

In 1999, Sun Life officially returned to India and China when it established two joint ventures – Birla Sun Life in India with a local partner Aditya Birla Group, and Sun Life Everbright in China with a partner China Everbright Group. Over the next decade, both operations grew rapidly – by September 2008, there were 132,460 Birla Sun Life advisors working in 600 branches across India while Sun Life Everbright opened its sixth branch in Guangzhou, bringing its presence to 18 cities in China.

2000s 
In early 1998, Sun Life announced its intention to demutualize. In March 2000, its initial public offering (IPO) started the trading of Sun Life Financial Inc. shares on the Toronto (TSX), New York (NYSE) and Philippine (PSE) stock exchanges.

In 2002, Sun Life combined its operations with Clarica Life Insurance of Waterloo, Ontario. Founded in 1870 as Mutual Life of Canada, Clarica was known as The Mutual Group before it went public in 1999. The former head office for Mutual Life Assurance Company at 227 King Street South in Waterloo became the home to Sun Life's Canadian operations, while a regional office and Sun Life's corporate headquarters remained in Toronto. The company also maintains regional offices in Montreal, Ottawa, Edmonton, Vancouver, Halifax and Calgary. After it integrated operations, the company used the Clarica brand name for certain products and activities until 2007.

In 2005, Sun Life opened a service center in Gurgaon, India to provide business processing and technology support for Sun Life Financial business units around the world. That same year, Sun Life purchased CMG Asia and CommServe Financial, the Hong Kong insurance and pension operations of the Commonwealth Bank of Australia, tripling its customer base and adding group insurance and pensions to its business lines.

In 2007, Sun Life purchased the U.S. employee benefits business of Genworth Financial, placing itself in the top 10 in the U.S. group benefits market.

In 2008, Sun Life sold its 37% interest in CI Financial Income Fund to Scotiabank. Sun Life had originally acquired a significant ownership interest in the firm by selling its Canadian mutual fund subsidiaries to CI Financial in 2002.

In 2009, Sun Life began an aggressive nationwide ad campaign in the United States touting its strength and the fact that it did not accept any bailout money.

2010s 
In 2013, Sun Life acquired 49% Aviva PLC's Malaysian insurance joint venture with lender CIMB Group. Sun Life acquired the business along with Malaysian state investor Khazanah Nasional, which also purchased 49%. They each paid approximately CDN$300 million. CIMB retains 2% interest.

In 2015, Sun Life acquired the Employee Benefits business of Assurant Inc. The transaction closed in March 2016, creating the sixth-largest group benefits business in the U.S.

In 2017, the Toronto Raptors of the National Basketball Association announced that Sun Life will become their jersey sponsor beginning with the 2017–18 NBA season. This deal continues through the 2019/2020 season.

In June 2019, Sun Life re-branded its Sun Life Investment Management unit to SLC Management and fully merged its fixed income businesses, Ryan Labs Asset Management Inc. and Prime Advisors, Inc. with Sun Life Capital Management (U.S.)

In addition, in July 2019, SLC's real estate division was merged under the name BentallGreenOak Real Estate.

In December 2020, Dean Connor announced his intent to retire as President and CEO in August 2021. He was then replaced by Kevin Strain, who was the former Chief Financial Officer at Sun Life.

Sun Life in North America

Canada 
Sun Life's Canadian headquarters are based out of the Regional Municipality of Waterloo, Ontario.

Sun Life contributes to the local economy as one of the top 5 major employers in the region, with approximately 3,500 employees – more than 40% of Sun Life's employee base in Canada.

Sun Life is an Observing Organization in the Regional Carbon Initiative (run by the Sustainable Waterloo Region) and a member of TravelWise, a joint program of Sustainable Waterloo Region and the Region of Waterloo.

Sun Life roots in Canada go back over 150 years and is estimated that the company provides financial products and advice to 1 in 5 Canadians.

In 2012, Sun Life celebrated the 100th anniversary of its Canadian head office building, located on King Street, right on the border of the Cities of Kitchener and Waterloo.

United States 
Sun Life's U.S. Headquarters are based out of Wellesley, a town in Norfolk County, Massachusetts and considered a part of Greater Boston.

Sun Life U.S. has the sixth-largest group benefits business in the United States and serves more than 60,000 employers in small, medium and large workplaces.

Sun Life's portfolio of insurance products and services in the U.S. includes disability, absence management, life, dental, vision, voluntary and medical stop-loss.

In 2018, Sun Life U.S. was named one of the Top Places to Work in Massachusetts for 2018 by The Boston Globe.

In 2022, Sun Life U.S. acquired DentaQuest for $2.475 billion dollars. DentaQuest is the largest provider of Medicaid dental benefits in the U.S. with growing Medicare Advantage, commercial and U.S. Affordable Care Act (ACA) exchange businesses.

Sun Life Asset Management 
Sun Life's asset management operation includes subsidiaries:

 MFS Investment Management, which serves individual and institutional investors around the world;
 SLC Management, which provides investment solutions for defined benefit pension plans, insurance companies and other institutional investors globally. SLC Management has two distinct units: a fixed-income pillar operating under the SLC Management banner (including Sun Life affiliates Prime Advisors, Ryan Labs Asset Management and Sun Life Institutional Investments); and a real estate division named Bentall GreenOak.
In December 2019, Sun Life announced an intention to acquire a majority stake in InfraRed Capital Partners, which will see InfraRed form part of SLC Management 
In October 2020, Sun Life announced an intent to acquire a 51% stake in alternative credit investment manager Crescent Capital LP. Crescent will be part of SLC Management.

As of March 31, 2019, SLC Management's collective operations have assets under management of C$212 billion (US$159 billion).

SLC Management 
SLC Management, formerly Sun Life Investment Management (SLIM), began in 2014 when Sun Life created Sun Life Institutional Investments (Canada) Inc., to offer a range of institutional alternative asset class funds to investors in Canada.

In June 2019, Sun Life re-branded SLIM to SLC Management and fully merged its fixed income businesses, Ryan Labs Asset Management Inc. and Prime Advisors, Inc. with Sun Life Capital Management (U.S.) In addition, in July 2019, SLC's real estate division was merged under the name BentallGreenOak Real Estate.

Sun Life in Asia 
Sun Life operates in eight Asian markets - Indonesia, Singapore, Vietnam, China, Hong Kong, India, the Philippines and Malaysia.

In 1891, the company persuaded businessman Ira Thayer to go to Asia to start an insurance business. Thayer set up a business in China in 1892 that went on to prosper for the next 54 years.

Sun Life grew to become the biggest foreign insurer in China until the Second World War when it shut down operations. The company returned to China in 1995 via a joint venture.

China 
In 1995, Sun Life joined with the China Everbright Group to form Sun Life Everbright.

In 2002, Sun Life Everbright was granted approval to sell life insurance in Tianjin, China, becoming the first foreign life insurance joint venture to operate in that city and its neighbouring counties.

In 2011, Sun Life Everbright received regulatory approval in China to establish Sun Life Everbright Insurance Asset Management Company, only the 12th such license issued in China.

India 
Birla Sun Life Asset Management, now known as the Aditya Birla Sun Life Mutual Fund (ABSLAMC), is an investment managing company registered under the Securities and Exchange Board of India. It is a joint venture between Sun Life and the Aditya Birla Group of India.

Established in 1994, BSLAMC has been a joint venture between the Aditya Birla Group and Sun Life since 1999.

With more than $34 billion U.S. in assets under management as of 2017, Aditya Birla Sun Life Asset Management Company is one of the largest asset managers in India.

Philippines 
Sun Life entered the Philippines in 1895, and established its Cebu operations in the 1960s. As of 2019, Sun Life is the number one provider of insurance products to Filipinos. Sun Life has been in Asia since the early 1890s.

In 1895, Sun Life began its operations in the Philippines through the representation of the H.J. Andrews and Co., a British trading firm. Throughout the Philippine Revolution, Sun Life Philippines experienced continuous growth.

Sun Life had underground operations during the Japanese Occupation which occurred between 1942 and 1945. Sun Life was the only life insurance company who paid post-war death claims amounting to USD 1.3 million even without documents attesting to the validity of the claims. In the end, all claims were found to be legitimate.

Through the years, Sun Life flourished even as the country faced economic crises and Martial Law (1972-1981).

In 2011, Sun Life signed a joint venture agreement with the Yuchengco Group of companies for the creation of Sun Life Grepa Financial Inc. marking Sun Life's entry into the bancassurance business.

Sun Life also has strong asset management presence in Philippines, celebrating its 120th anniversary in the Philippines in 2015.

In 2020, Sun Life Philippines celebrated its 125th anniversary.

Sustainability 
Sun Life's sustainability plan is built on the foundation as a trusted and responsible business, and focuses on the areas where they can make the most positive social and environmental impact - increasing financial security, fostering healthier lives and advancing sustainable investing.

In March 2021, Sun Life announced new sustainable investing commitments, including an additional C$20 billion in sustainable investments over the next five years across its General Account and third party investments. The company is also pushing to scale back its GHG emissions intensity by 30% by 2030.

Diversity Equity & Inclusion 
Sun Life committed to having 25% of under-represented minorities and gender parity at senior leader level by 2025. As of May 2022, their Board of Directors is at gender parity.

New Global Headquarters - One York

Sun Life Global Headquarters in Toronto, Ontario, is located at One York Street in Toronto's South Core.

The building was developed by Menkes Developments Ltd, and Healthcare of Ontario Pension Plan (HOOPP), which is also a tenant of the building.

The 800,000 square-foot office tower is LEED Platinum certified under the Canada Green Building Council.

This location along the Gardiner Expressway is a prominent position on the Toronto skyline,

Before the Corporate Office moved to its new Global HQ at One York Street, the Sun Life Centre on King Street served as its headquarters. Previously, Sun Life Building in Montreal was the head office. The Sun Life Building in Montreal is a historic 122 m (400 ft), 24 storey office building at 1155 Metcalfe Street on Dorchester Square in downtown Montreal.

Sports Marketing

Toronto Raptors NBA Jersey Sponsorship (2017–present) 
Sun Life is the official jersey sponsor of the 2019 NBA Champions Toronto Raptors of the National Basketball Association.

Sun Life has been the Raptors jersey sponsor since the 2017–18 NBA Season. This agreement was extended into the 2018/19 & 2019/20 seasons.

It is the first jersey patch partnership in the team's history with the Sun Life patch appearing on the front left shoulder of Raptors game jerseys.

Jersey sponsorships were introduced league-wide as part of a three-year NBA pilot program.

Miami Dolphins NFL Stadium Sponsorship (2010–2016) 
In 2010, Sun Life purchased the naming rights for the home field of the Miami Dolphins in Miami Gardens, Florida, for a reported US$7.5 million per year.

Under the five-year contract, the stadium was named Sun Life Stadium. The naming rights expired in January 2016.

Corporate governance
Current members of the board of directors of Sun Life are:
 Scott F. Powers (Chair of the Board)
 Deepak Chopra (Corporate Director)
 Stephanie L. Coyles (Corporate Director)
 Ashok K. Gupta (Corporate Director)
 M. Marianne Harris (Corporate Director)
 David H.Y. Ho (Corporate Director)
 Helen M. Mallovy Hicks (Corporate Director)
 Marie-Lucie Morin (Corporate Director)
 Kevin D. Strain (President & CEO)
 Barbara G. Stymiest (Corporate Director)

Notes

External links
 Official website

 
Canadian brands
Companies based in Toronto
Financial services companies established in 1865
1865 establishments in Ontario
Companies listed on the Toronto Stock Exchange
Former mutual insurance companies
Investment management companies of Canada
S&P/TSX 60
Canadian companies established in 1865